Let It All Out is an album by Nina Simone, released by Philips Records in February 1966.

The song "Chauffeur" is an adaptation of Memphis Minnie's "Me and My Chauffeur Blues" (1941), which Simone first heard Big Mama Thornton sing. Thornton released her version as "Me and My Chauffeur" on the B-side of her "Before Day" single on James Moore's Sharp label in 1964. Simone's version is credited to Andy Stroud, her husband and manager at the time, who adapted it and "Nearer Blessed Lord" for her.

"Images", sung a cappella by Simone, is based on a poem by Waring Cuney.

Track listing
"Mood Indigo" (Irving Mills, Barney Bigard, Duke Ellington)
"The Other Woman" (Jessie Mae Robinson)
"Love Me or Leave Me" (Walter Donaldson, Gus Kahn)
"Don't Explain" (Billie Holiday, Arthur Herzog, Jr.)
"Little Girl Blue" (Richard Rodgers, Lorenz Hart)
"Chauffeur" (Andy Stroud)
"For Myself" (Van McCoy)
"The Ballad of Hollis Brown" (Bob Dylan)
"This Year's Kisses" (Irving Berlin)
"Images" (Nina Simone, Waring Cuney)
"Nearer Blessed Lord" (Stroud)

Source: AllMusic

Personnel
Nina Simone – piano, vocals, arranger
Rudy Stevenson – guitar, flute
Lisle Atkinson – bass
Bobby Hamilton – drums
Horace Ott – arranger, conductor

Charts

References

1966 albums
Nina Simone albums
Philips Records albums
Albums produced by Hal Mooney
Albums conducted by Horace Ott
Albums arranged by Horace Ott